Hugh Sutherland was the head coach of the Central Michigan college football program in 1908.

Head coaching record

References

Year of birth missing
Year of death missing
Central Michigan Chippewas football coaches